is a 2001 Japanese drama film written, directed and edited by Shinji Aoyama, starring Hiroshi Mikami. It was in competition at the 2001 Cannes Film Festival.

Plot
The film's main theme is the conflict between work and family commitments in modern Japan.  It focuses on a successful internet entrepreneur Nagai (Hiroshi Mikami), whose wife Akira (Maho Toyota) and young daughter Kaai (Yukiko Ikari) left him because he neglected them for his business.  A young hustler Keechie (Shuji Kashiwabara), who has emotion problems concerning his own father, becomes involved in the family's drama.

Cast
 Hiroshi Mikami - Nagai
 Maho Toyota - Akira
 Shuji Kashiwabara - Keechie
 Yukiko Ikari - Kaai
 Isao Natsuyagi - Tsuyoshi's father
 Kumiko Akiyoshi - Keechie's client
 Itsuji Itao - Interviewer

Reception
Derek Malcolm of Screen International criticized the film, saying: "the problem with the film is that, instead of letting these sequences speak for themselves, it constantly underscores them with speeches that often seem pretentious and clichéd at the same time". David Rooney of Variety praised Masaki Tamura's cinematography, describing it as "graceful, leisurely camerawork and elegant framing".

References

External links
 
 

2001 films
2000s Japanese-language films
2001 drama films
Films directed by Shinji Aoyama
Japanese drama films
2000s Japanese films